Bizkaia Arena is an indoor arena in Barakaldo, Greater Bilbao. It is the biggest multipurpose hall in Spain, as it can hold up to 26,000 people, and 15,414 for indoor sports. The arena is part of the Bilbao Exhibition Centre (BEC) complex, the Exhibition and Congress Centre of Bilbao and Biscay, inaugurated in April 2004.

The venue regularly hosts basketball games, for which it has a capacity of 15,414. It was one of the six venues used for the 2014 FIBA Basketball World Cup, hosted by Spain. The arena hosted the annual MTV Europe Music Awards in 2018 as the awards show was held in Spain for the third time and the first time in Bilbao.

History
The arena was used as the home arena of the Spanish League basketball club Bilbao Basket during the 2009-10 season. In other seasons, it has also occasionally been used for their most attractive games. It hosted the 2010 Spanish King's Cup Final Eight.

The arena hosted a preseason game between Bilbao Basket and the NBA team the Philadelphia 76ers. Several international pop and rock acts have also performed at the Bizkaia Arena.

The venue has also been used for other kinds of shows, such as opera, Disney on Ice, etc., political speeches, and religious meetings.

See also
Bilbao Exhibition Centre
Bilbao Arena
List of indoor arenas in Spain

References

External links

Bilbao Basket Official Website 

Indoor arenas in Spain
Basketball venues in Spain
Sports venues in the Basque Country (autonomous community)
Barakaldo
Bilbao Basket
Sport in Biscay